Steven Ho may refer to:
Steven Ho (martial artist) (born 1973), Chinese American martial artist, entrepreneur, stunt coordinator and stuntman
Steven Ho (politician) (born 1979), member of the Legislative Council of Hong Kong